German–Slovak relations are foreign relations between Germany and Slovakia. Both countries established diplomatic relations in 1993 but previously had relations during World War II when Slovakia was a separate state, the Slovak Republic. Germany has an embassy in Bratislava. Slovakia has an embassy in Berlin, an embassy branch in Bonn, and a consulate-general in Munich. Germany plays an important part in the Slovak economy as it is Slovakia's main trading partner.

Both countries are full members of NATO, the European Union and the Organization for Security and Co-operation in Europe.

History

Weimar Republic
Parallel to the establishment of the Weimar Republic, Czechoslovakia was born. Slovakia was a part of this new-born state. German diplomats in Bratislava and in Košice tried to influence Czechoslovak domestic policy by allying with factions of the Carpathian Germans and the Slovak People's Party. Both groups in their majority proved to be incompatible with German goals in the region. Weimar's policy failed.

World War II
During World War II, Slovakia was an ally of Nazi Germany as part of the Axis. The Slovak Republic under President Josef Tiso signed the Tripartite Pact on November 24, 1940. Slovakia had been closely aligned with Germany almost immediately from its declaration of independence from Czechoslovakia on March 14, 1939. Slovakia entered into a treaty of protection Schutzvertrag with Germany on March 23, 1939. This treaty aligned Slovakia's foreign and defence policies with Germany, and allowed German troops to form a protection zone in the western parts of Slovakia.

Slovak troops joined the German invasion of Poland, having interest in Spiš and Orava.  Those two regions (along with Cieszyn Silesia) were divided and disputed between Poland and Czechoslovakia since 1918, until the Poles fully annexed them following the Munich agreement. After the September Campaign, Slovakia reclaimed control of those territories.

In July 1940, Germany successfully demanded the resignation of Slovak politicians who advocated an independent foreign policy at the Salzburg Conference. During the war, approximately 70,000 Slovak Jews were sent to concentration camps to perish in the Holocaust. In September 1942, a Slovak-German treaty was signed detailing the conditions for the deportation of Slovak Jews.

Slovakia was spared German military occupation until the Slovak National Uprising, which began on August 29, 1944, and was crushed by the Waffen SS and Slovak troops loyal to Josef Tiso, dictator of Slovakia.

Post World War II
Following World War II, Slovak Socialist Republic became a communist state with the Czech Socialist Republic as Czechoslovakia. This continued until a peaceful dissolution in 1993 into the Slovak Republic and Czech Republic.

Relations during this period were primarily between the German Democratic Republic (East Germany) and Czechoslovakia under the Warsaw Pact.

Post 1992
Following the creation of democratic Slovakia and German reunification, both countries traded under a free market economy.

In March 2001, a German court rejected compensation complaints from Slovakia's surviving Jews from the Holocaust. Claims were rejected again in 2002. In 2003, Slovak Jews made a collective claim of 77 million euros to Germany. The 2003 lawsuit filed against Germany by the Central Union of Jewish Religious Communities in the Slovak Republic (UZZNO) was made to reclaim compensation for monies paid by the wartime Slovak government to Germany to cover the cost of Germany's deportation of 57,000 members of the country's Jewish population.

State visits
The following state visits have occurred in recent times:
German Federal President Horst Köhler visited Slovakia on 2 November 2005. German Chancellor Angela Merkel paid her first official visit to the Slovak Republic on 11 May 2006.

President Ivan Gašparovič visited Germany in July 2006. In the same month, the new Slovak Foreign Minister Kubiš paid his first official visit to Berlin. Prime Minister Robert Fico visited Germany in April 2007.

Economic relations
Germany is Slovakia's largest trading partner.

In 2003, Germany was the biggest investor in Slovakia, with its volume of direct investment at about 1.94 billion euro as of March 31, 2003. At the time, Germany made 26.4% of all foreign direct investments in Slovakia.

This trend has continued in 2009, around 400 German firms are active in Slovakia investing 2.5 billion euro, making Germany is the biggest investor in Slovakia.

Car manufacturing
In 1991, Volkswagen AG opened a factory in Bratislava. Revenue from the plant in 2003 was 4.5 billion euro.  By 2006, the company had invested 1.3 billion EUR in its operations and employed 9,000 staff at the time.

In April 2009, Volkswagen AG announced plans to build a new compact family vehicle in Slovakia. The company will invest about 308 million euros. VW currently builds its Touareg, Škoda Octavia as well as its Audi Q7 in Bratislava and employs about 7,800 people in the nation, which has emerged a major hub in the global car industry. Porsche also builds its Cayenne model in Bratislava.

Cooperation
In 1997, the two countries signed a military cooperation agreement.

In 2003, an e-government partnership was developed between the countries with the assistance of Siemens and Microsoft.

Key bilateral agreements include those on social insurance (instrument of ratification signed on 17 October 2003) and on road transport (signed on 14 June 2002).

See also
 Foreign relations of Germany
 Foreign relations of Slovakia
 Slovaks in Germany
 Germans in Slovakia

References

External links
 German Foreign Office about the relation with Slovakia
 Germany embassy in Bratislava (in German and Slovak only)
 Slovak embassy in Berlin

 

 
Slovakia
Bilateral relations of Slovakia